David III Kuropalates (Davit’ III Kurapalati) or David III the Great (დავით III დიდი, Davit’ III Didi), also known as David II, (c. 930s – 1000/1001) was a Georgian prince of the Bagratid family of Tao, a historic region in the Georgian–Armenian marchlands, from 966 until his murder in 1000 or 1001. Kuropalates was a Byzantine courtier title bestowed upon him in 978 and again in 990.

David is best known for his crucial assistance to the Byzantine Macedonian dynasty in the 976–9 civil war and his unique role in the political unification of various Georgian polities as well as his patronage of Christian culture and learning. Between 987 and 989, David joined his friend Bardas Phocas in a revolt against the Byzantine emperor Basil II, but was defeated and agreed to cede his lands to the empire on his death. Yet he was able to secure for his heir, Bagrat III, an opportunity to become the first ruler of a unified Georgian kingdom.

History
David was the younger son of Adarnase V, a representative of the Second House of Tao, a branch of the Kartli line of the Georgian Bagrationi (Bagratid) dynasty which held sway over Tao (a province on the historic Georgian-Armenian border known to the Armenians as Tayk; now part of Turkey) since the extinction of the original Tao line in the 940s.

Alliance with the Byzantine Empire
He succeeded his brother, Bagrat II, as a duke of Tao in 966, and through his expansionist policy and flexible diplomacy began assembling a larger state. In order to enact his ambitious plans, David had to secure his independence from the Byzantine Empire, which would reach its greatest height under the emperor Basil II (r. 976–1025).

The Byzantines' eastern neighbors – the fragmented Armenian and Georgian principalities – rarely threatened the empire directly, but were of particular interest to Constantinople as they controlled strategic international trade routes that ran through their domains. The Byzantines had already annexed the Armenian principalities of Taron (966) and Manzikert (968) and posed a potential danger to the constellation of several Georgian Bagratid principalities known as Tao-Klarjeti. However, the integrity of the empire itself was under serious threat after a full-scale rebellion, led by Bardas Skleros, broke out in 976. Following a series of successful battles the rebels swept across Asia Minor and threatened Constantinople itself. In the urgency of a situation, the young emperor Basil requested aid from David of Tao, who promptly responded and sent 12,000 first-rate cavalry troops under the command of Tornikios to reinforce the recently defeated loyal Byzantine general Bardas Phokas, thereby contributing to the decisive loyalist victory at the Battle of Pankalia near Caesarea on 24 March 979.

David's reward was the lifetime rule of key imperial territories in eastern Asia Minor, known to the contemporary Georgian sources as the "Upper Lands of Greece" (ზემონი ქუეყანანი საბერძნეთისანი), consisting chiefly of northwestern Armenian lands: the city of Theodosiopolis or Karin (Geo. Karnu-kalaki, present-day Erzurum, Turkey), Phasiane, Hark (now Muş Province), Apahunik, Mardali (Mardaghi), Khaldoyarich, and Chormayri. On this occasion, he was granted the high Byzantine court title of kouropalates. Basil II also rewarded the valor of David's commander Tornikios by funding a Georgian Orthodox monastery on Mount Athos. Although populated now chiefly with Greek monks, it is to this day known as Iviron, "of the Iberians (i.e. Georgians)".

These formidable acquisitions made David the most influential ruler in the Caucasus, enabling him to interfere in and arbitrate dynastic disputes in both Georgia and Armenia. The medieval Georgian authors call him "greatest of all the kings of Tao" and the eleventh-century Armenian chronicler Aristakes Lastivertsi describes him as:

Being in control of highly important commercial centers, his principality profited from taxing the major trading routes running through southwestern Caucasus and eastern Anatolia. David invested these revenues in extensive building projects: constructing towns, forts and churches, and promoting Georgian monastic communities and cultural activities both in Georgia and abroad.

Issue of succession
Having no children of his own, David adopted his kinsman, the young prince Bagrat, heir to the Bagratid throne of Kartli (Iberia). He did so at the request of the energetic Georgian nobleman Iovane Marushis-dze. Through his fortunate bloodlines Bagrat was destined to sit upon two thrones. Furthermore, through his mother Gurandukht, sister of the childless Abkhazian king Theodosius III, Bagrat was a potential heir to the realm of Abkhazia. Making a plan for the creation of an all-Georgian state, David occupied Kartli for his foster-son in 976 and repulsed the troops from the easternmost Georgian Kingdom of Kakheti, which had recently occupied the western sector of Kartli with its rock-hewn city of Uplistsikhe. Two years later, in 978, David and Marushis-dze secured the crown of Abkhazia for Bagrat by displacing Theodosius III.

David's good fortunes changed in 987 when he, anxious to make his extensive possessions a hereditary Bagratid domain, joined his long-time friend Bardas Phokas in a rebellion against the emperor Basil. Once the rebels were defeated by the Byzantine-Rus' forces in 989, Basil dispatched a strong force under John of Chaldea to punish the Georgians, and David had to submit. Reconciled with the emperor, he was granted, in c. 990, the title of kuropalates again in return for his promise that upon his death the lands previously placed under his sovereignty would revert to the Byzantine Empire.

Another problem arose around the same year, when Bagrat of Abkhazia planned a punitive expedition against the non-submissive duke Rati of Kldekari in Lower Kartli. Persuaded that his foster-son intended to attack Tao and kill him, David crushed the army led by Bagrat's natural father Gurgen on its march to Kldekari. As a medieval Georgian chronicler relates:

Last years and death
After the reconciliation with the emperor and his kinsmen, David led a series of successful raids against the Muslim emirates of Lake Van and Azerbaijan and against the Emirate of Tbilisi. Bagrat II of Georgia (grandfather of Bagrat, David's adoptee), and Gagik I of Armenia allied themselves with David, who recaptured Manzikert from the Marwanid emir of Diyar Bakr about 993 and raided Akhlat, another important stronghold of this Kurdish dynasty, in 997. Mamlan, the Rawadid emir of Azarbaijan, was also twice defeated, the second time decisively, in 998, near Archesh.

David was murdered by his nobles early in 1000 or 1001. According to Aristakes:

Although the Georgian Chronicles maintain that David died in 1001, several Armenian and Muslim accounts suggest he may have died in 1000. Aristakes gives the date of David's death as March 28, 1001, which is closely corroborated by another Armenian chronicler Asoghik who says David died on the Easter day of the year 449 of the Armenian calendar, i.e., March 31, 1001. Yet another Armenian, Samuel Anetsi, also puts the date as 1001.

Wars of the Kuropalates’ succession

Basil II was at that time in the eastern provinces of his empire, wintering on the plain of Tarsus following his campaign against the Fatimid dynasty in Syria. On hearing of David's death he marched north-eastward to claim the lands David had promised to the emperor. The local Georgian and Armenian nobility submitted without any serious resistance. The only notable incident occurred when a quarrel between a Georgian soldier and a Varangian Guardsman over a bale of hay developed into a major fight, involving 6,000 Varangians and taking the lives of thirty Georgian high-ranking nobles.

King Bagrat, David's foster-son, met with Basil but, unable to prevent the annexation of David's realm, had to recognize the new borders in reward of the imperial title of kouropalates. Despite this setback, Bagrat was able to become the first king of an all-Georgian unified monarchy, a result made possible largely by the efforts of David of Tao, who, as the modern scholar Stephen Rapp puts in, "appropriately ranks high on any 'Top Ten' list of Georgian history."

There is some disagreement among modern scholars on whether David ceded to the Byzantines only those lands which had been granted to him as a reward for his assistance against the rebel Bardas Skleros, or if it had been the whole of his principality that was acquired by Basil II. As the former was endowed upon David for lifetime stewardship, it would be more reasonable to assume that he conceded his entire realm, i.e., Thither Tao/Tayk and the adjacent Armenian counties up to Lake Van. Whatever the extent of David's domain, the Georgian kings would not so easily reconcile with the loss of those territories, leading to a series of conflicts with the Byzantine Empire in the eleventh century.

References 

930s births
1000s deaths
Bagrationi dynasty of Tao
Year of birth uncertain
Year of death uncertain
Grand dukes of Tao
10th-century rulers in Asia
10th-century murdered monarchs
Deaths by poisoning
Kouropalatai